Natália do Vale (born March 6, 1953) is a Brazilian actress. She appeared in leading roles in several television programs, including Olho no Olho, Água Viva and Women in Love.

Biography
Vale was born in Floriano, the daughter of Portuguese immigrants who moved to Brazil in search of better financial conditions. She had only one brother, named Antonio Ferreira do Vale. Her parents and brother are already deceased.

In the 70s, she moved with his family to São Paulo in search of better living conditions. In São Paulo, Natália took the entrance exam and graduated in philosophy from the University of São Paulo. To help support the household, she worked as an intern, assisting a geography teacher in a course of pre-university entrance exam.

Filmography

Television

Film 
 1981 – Kilas, o Mau da Fita – Lily-Bobó
 1983 – Pra Frente Brasil – Marta
 2007 – Polaroides Urbanas – Paula

Theatre 
 1978 – Bonifácio Bilhões
 1979 – A Calça – Luisa
 1979 – Roda Cor de Roda
 1990 – A Partilha – Selma
 2000 – A Vida Passa – Selma
 2002 – Capitanias Hereditárias – Stella

References

External links 

1951 births
Living people
Actresses from Rio de Janeiro (city)
Brazilian people of Portuguese descent
Brazilian television actresses
University of São Paulo alumni
20th-century Brazilian actresses
21st-century Brazilian actresses